Polzow is a municipality in the Vorpommern-Greifswald district, in Mecklenburg-Vorpommern, Germany.

References

Vorpommern-Greifswald